George Alexander Duncan (15 May 1902 – 14 January 2006), publishing as G. A. Duncan, was an Irish economist and academic, specialising in political economy and the Austrian school of economics. He was Professor of Political Economy at the Trinity College Dublin from 1934 to 1967, and Pro-Chancellor of the University of Dublin from 1965 to 1972.

Selected works

References

1902 births
2006 deaths
Academics of Trinity College Dublin
Austrian School economists
Irish centenarians
20th-century Irish economists
Men centenarians
Political economists
Scholars of Trinity College Dublin